The Arado Ar 68 was a German single-seat biplane fighter developed in the mid-1930s. It was among the first fighters produced when Germany abandoned the restrictions of the Treaty of Versailles and began rearming.

Design and development
Designed to replace the Heinkel He 51, the Ar 68 proved to have admirable handling characteristics on its first flight in early 1934, despite Arado's inability to secure a sufficiently powerful engine for the prototype. Eventually, a Junkers Jumo 210 was installed and the Ar 68 went into production, though not before worries about the unforgiving nature of such a high-performance aircraft almost resulted in the cancellation of the project.

The Ar 68 entered service with the Luftwaffe in 1936 and one of the first units was stationed in East Prussia. Soon, the fighter was sent to fight in the Spanish Civil War, where it was outclassed by the Soviet Polikarpov I-16. Arado responded by upgrading the engine of the Ar 68E, which soon became the Luftwaffes most widely used fighter in 1937–38, before being replaced by the Messerschmitt Bf 109. The last Ar 68s served as night fighters up to the winter of 1939–40, after which they served as fighter-trainers until 1944.

Variants
Data from:
Ar 68V1
Prototype, powered by a  BMW VI engine. First flight in 1934.
Ar 68a
First prototype. 1 x  BMW VId V-12.
Ar 68b
Second prototype. 1 x  Jumo 210A inverted V-12.
Ar 68c
Third prototype. 1 x  Jumo 210A inverted V-12.
Ar 68d
Fourth prototype. 1 x  BMW VId V-12.
Ar 68 V4
The fourth prototype (Ar 68d), redesignated after the RLM(Reichs Luftfahrtministerium) introduced the standardised Versuchs (research) number system.
Ar 68e
Fifth prototype. 1 x  Jumo 210Da inverted V-12.
Ar 68 V5
The fifth prototype (Ar 68e), redesignated after the RLM introduced the standardised Versuchs (research) number system.
Ar 68E
Ar 68F
Ar 68G
Abortive attempt to fit a supercharged  BMW VI.
Ar 68H
Only a single prototype was built, powered by a ) BMW 132Da 9-cyl. supercharged air-cooled radial. It had two additional machine guns in the upper wing and had an enclosed cockpit, the first Arado aircraft to be so treated.

Operators

Luftwaffe

Spanish Air Force

Specifications (Ar 68F)

See also

References

Single-engined tractor aircraft
Biplanes
Arado Ar 068
Ar 068
Aircraft first flown in 1934